Femme Osage is an unincorporated community in southwest St. Charles County, in the U.S. state of Missouri. The community is on Missouri Route T along the bank of the Femme Osage Creek.

History
A post office Femme Osage was in operation from 1816 until 1933. The community takes its name from nearby Femme Osage Creek.

References

Unincorporated communities in St. Charles County, Missouri
Unincorporated communities in Missouri